Sky Odyssey, known in Japan as , is an action/adventure flight simulator for the Sony PlayStation 2.  It was developed by Cross and released in 2000. The game's soundtrack was composed by Kow Otani, who also composed the music for Shadow of the Colossus, a variety of Gamera films, and various anime.

The game follows an Indiana Jones-style storyline in which the player character flies through several areas of a fictional world, collecting artifacts as well as pieces of a map. The adventure mode of the game focuses on reaching the hidden tower of Maximus, which is located on one of four uncharted islands which are explored in the game.

Gameplay
The player in the game is given control of 10 different aircraft, 7 of which must be unlocked. These range from real world aircraft (such as the Fairey Swordfish), to prototypes that never saw actual flight (e.g. the Kyūshū J7W), to completely fictional ones. While a few of these are military aircraft, no combat actually takes place in the game. Instead players are given the task of flying complex missions to search for the map pieces needed to find the Tower of Maximus. Most missions involve traversing from one point on the games map to the next, but rarely is this straight forward. The missions often follow a path that requires flight through extreme terrain such as canyons, caves, and mountain peaks.

To further complicate things, rogue weather patterns, rock slides, and other natural phenomena will constantly impede on progress into these areas and will often threaten to destroy the player's aircraft. In addition, several of the game's levels require certain tasks to be completed to advance. Examples of these include mid air refueling with a moving train, or attempting a fuel dump in order to cross a high mountain pass. After the mission is complete, players are given a score ranging from A+ to D and can buy new parts to customize their aircraft. Higher scores lead to more parts being made available for purchase. In addition to the main adventure there are two bonus modes called Target Mode and Sky Canvas Mode.

In Target Mode players must take off and navigate through a series of targets in the shortest amount of time as possible and return to the runway for landing. Sky Canvas Mode requires players to Skywrite different words and symbols before the smoke can be blown away by the wind. There is also a training mode and a Free Flight mode. Training mode introduces players to the controls of the game while Free Flight mode lets players freely fly their unlocked aircraft without the restrictions or dangers found in the main part of the game.

Reception

The game received "generally favorable reviews" according to the review aggregation website Metacritic. Kevin Rice of NextGen said, "Sky Odyssey is one of those peculiar games that will have half the people loving it and the other half wondering what the commotion is. It's definitely good, but it won't suit everyone's taste." In Japan, Famitsu gave it a score of 28 out of 40.

IGN said that the game "belongs in the software library of every PlayStation 2 owner." It also said that while some may be turned off by the game's lack of violence, "the intensity and adrenaline levels that players will reach while playing this game really surpass what you'll ever likely get in a straight action game." GameSpot praised the game for its wide variety of aircraft and missions. GameSpot also liked the weather effects and physics in the game.

Both sides however noted that the game's graphics were not up to par, and stated that the game was somewhat difficult for newcomers.

Not all reviews were positive however. IGN and GameSpot noted that the game is not for everyone, especially those expecting a "straight up action game." Still, GameSpot said in the closing of their review that, "those that are willing to overlook the game's graphical imperfections and can grapple with its relatively steep learning curve will be rewarded with a fully satisfying game experience."

The game won the awards for "Simulation Game of 2000" and "Game No One Played of 2000" at IGNs Best of 2000 Awards, and was also a runner-up for Overall PS2 Game of the Year. It was also a runner-up for GameSpots annual "Best PlayStation 2 Game" and, among console games, "Best Simulation Game" awards.

In an IGN list of top 10 most underrated games, the game came in at number 6 on the list.

Notes

References

External links
Official website

2000 video games
Activision games
CAProduction games
Flight simulation video games
PlayStation 2 games
PlayStation 2-only games
Single-player video games
Sony Interactive Entertainment games
Video games developed in Japan
Video games scored by Kow Otani